Wild Life is a 2014 French-Belgian drama film directed by Cédric Kahn and adapted from the 2010 book Hors système, onze ans sous l'étoile de la liberté by Xavier Fortin, Okwari Fortin, Shahi'Yena Fortin and Laurence Vidal. The film won the Special Jury Prize at the 62nd San Sebastián International Film Festival. In January 2015, the film received three nominations at the 20th Lumières Awards.

Cast 
 Mathieu Kassovitz as Paco (Philippe Fournier)
 Céline Sallette as Nora (Carole Garcia)
 David Gastou as Tsali Fournier (9-year-old)
 Sofiane Neveu as Okyesa Fournier (8-year-old)
 Romain Depret as Tsali Fournier (teenager)
 Jules Ritmanic as Okyesa Fournier (teenager)
 Jenna Thiam as Céline 
 Tara-Jay Bangalter as Thomas (11-year-old)
 Amandine Dugas as Clara 
 Michaël Dichter as Gaspard 
 Brigitte Sy as Geneviève 
 Julien Thiou as Clovis 
 Judith Simon as Dom

References

External links 
 

2014 films
2014 drama films
2010s French-language films
French drama films
Films directed by Cédric Kahn
Drama films based on actual events
Films based on biographies
Belgian drama films
French-language Belgian films
2010s French films